Fairmount City (also known as Fairmont City) is an unincorporated community in Clarion County, Pennsylvania, United States. The community is located on Redbank Creek and Pennsylvania Route 28, immediately upstream of New Bethlehem. Fairmount City has a post office with ZIP code 16224.

References

Unincorporated communities in Clarion County, Pennsylvania
Unincorporated communities in Pennsylvania